Skagway Seaplane Base  is a state-owned public-use seaplane base located in Skagway, Alaska. It is included in the National Plan of Integrated Airport Systems for 2011–2015, which categorized it as a general aviation facility.

Facilities and aircraft 
Skagway Seaplane Base has one seaplane landing area designated 4/22 which measures 2,000 by 2,000 feet (610 x 610 m). For the 12-month period ending December 31, 2006, the airport had 250 aircraft operations, an average of 20 per month: 80% general aviation and 20% air taxi.

See also 
 Skagway Airport
 List of airports in Alaska

References

External links 
 Topographic map from USGS The National Map

Airports in Alaska
Transportation in Municipality of Skagway Borough, Alaska
Seaplane bases in the United States
Buildings and structures in the Municipality of Skagway Borough, Alaska